Rude Awakening is an American television sitcom series created by Claudia Lonow, that aired on Showtime over fifty-five 22-minute episodes spanning three seasons (1998–2001).

Story
Rude Awakening tells the story of Billie Frank, an out of work alcoholic ex-soap-opera actress. She tries to go sober and become a writer but continues to struggle with her self-destructive habits. The show depicts her relations with other members of AA, her neighbor Dave, and her mother, Trudy.

Episodes

Cast

Main
 Sherilyn Fenn as Billie Frank
 Lynn Redgrave as Trudy Frank
 Jonathan Penner as Dave Parelli 
 Rain Pryor as Jackie Garcia (seasons 1–2)
 Roger E. Mosley as Milton "Milt" Johnson (season 2)
 Mario Van Peebles as Marcus Adams (season 3)

Recurring
 Paul Ben-Victor as Carl
 Corinne Bohrer as Tish Frank
 Taylor Dayne as Maureen
 Dan Finnerty as Joe the Bartender
 Tom Gallop as Jerry Frank
 Jason Graae as Chad
 Richard Lewis as Harve Schwartz
 Mark Lonow as Max Frank
 Ana Mercedes as Antonia the Maid
 Beverly D'Angelo as Sidney 'Syd' Gibson (season 2)
 Tim Curry as Martin Crisp (seasons 2–3)
 Jack Plotnick as Clark (seasons 2–3)
 Roger Daltrey as Nobby Clegg (season 2)
 George Katt as Zack (season 2)
 Elizabeth Lackey as Raquel (season 3)
 Salli Richardson as Nancy Adams (season 3)
 Jenny Robertson as Haley (season 3)

Notable guest stars
Karen Black as Crystal Garcia
Jennifer Coolidge as Sue
Lana Parrilla as Nurse Lorna
Ron Glass as Marcus' father
CCH Pounder as Tracy
Beverly D'Angelo as Sidney Gibson
Jason Bateman as Ryan
Taylor Dayne as Maureen
Tim Curry as Martin Crisp
Roger Daltrey as Nobby Clegg
Martin Lewis as Nigel
Michelle Phillips as Vivian
Alan Young as Priest

References

External links

Rude Awakening at SeriesLive.com

1990s American single-camera sitcoms
1998 American television series debuts
2000s American single-camera sitcoms
2001 American television series endings
1990s American LGBT-related comedy television series
Television series by Sony Pictures Television
Showtime (TV network) original programming
English-language television shows
Television shows set in Los Angeles
2000s American LGBT-related comedy television series
American LGBT-related sitcoms